Ogden-Hinckley Airport  is a public airport four miles southwest of Ogden, in Weber County, Utah. The National Plan of Integrated Airport Systems for 2019–2023 categorized it as a commercial service–primary nonhub airport. Formerly Ogden Municipal Airport, it is billed as Utah's busiest municipal airport for private planes.

The airport has an FAA control tower with radar approach service by Salt Lake City TRACON.

History
During World War II the airfield was used by the United States Army Air Forces.

Western Airlines arrived in 1944 and United Airlines in 1946; both pulled out in 1959. West Coast Airlines replaced them until it pulled out in 1961.

In September 2012 Allegiant Air began non-stop flights to Phoenix-Mesa Gateway Airport.

On May 4, 2021  Avelo Airlines commenced service between Salt Lake City’s Ogden-Hinckley Airport (OGD) and Los Angeles’ Hollywood Burbank Airport (BUR). Flight XP107 departs BUR daily at 11:10 arriving OGD at 14:00 local time; flight XP108 departs OGD at 14:40, arriving BUR at 15:40 local time.

In April 2022, Allegiant Air announced that they would be stopping flights to Ogden citing a shortage of pilots as a main reason. In June 2022, Avelo announced that they would be stopping flights to Ogden as well. Avelo stated that the high price of fuel was a major factor in their decision to leave Ogden. The two airlines departing allowed the city to accelerate the previously scheduled renovation work, including constructing a new control tower and expanding the airport several thousand square feet.

Facilities

In 2010 the airport had 72,043 aircraft operations, average 197 per day: 99% general aviation, 1% military, and <1% airline. 244 aircraft were then based at the airport: 80% single-engine, 10% multi-engine, 5% helicopter, 3% jet, 1% ultralight, and 1% glider.

Accidents and incidents
 On December 18, 1953, a United States Air Force B-29 Superfortress intending to land at Hill Air Force Base landed at Ogden Municipal Airport by mistake. One of the eight crew was killed when the aircraft crashed and caught fire.
On January 16, 2020, a twin-engined Cessna approaching the airport clipped a house and crashed, killing the pilot.

See also
 Utah World War II Army Airfields

References

External links

 
 Ogden-Hinckley Airport  at City of Ogden website
 Aerial image as of October 1997 from USGS The National Map
 
 

Airports in Utah
Buildings and structures in Ogden, Utah
Transportation in Weber County, Utah
Airfields of the United States Army Air Forces in Utah